The Wallow Fire, named for the Bear Wallow Wilderness area where the fire originated, was a massive wildfire that started in the White Mountains near Alpine, Arizona on May 29, 2011. The fire eventually spread across the stateline into western New Mexico, United States.

Cause
The fire was started accidentally by two men who were camping. They cooperated with prosecutors and pleaded guilty to misdemeanor charges relating to mismanagement of their campfire.  In November, 2012 they were ordered to pay restitution in the amount of $3.7 million.

Response
The communities of Alpine, Blue River, Greer, Nutrioso, Sunrise, Springerville, Eagar in Arizona, and Luna in New Mexico were evacuated.  In addition to other aircraft, a converted DC-10 Very Large Air Tanker ("VLAT"), capable of dropping up to 12,000 gallons of fire retardant in seconds, was deployed to help fight the fire. On June 11, 2011, the leading edge of the fire advanced into Catron County, New Mexico.

On June 12, evacuations were lifted for Eagar, Springerville and South Fork. On June 14, the Wallow Fire became the largest fire in Arizona history, passing the Rodeo-Chediski Fire, which burned  in 2002.  On June 18 and 20, evacuations were lifted for Alpine and Greer and on June 21, the evacuation for Luna, NM was lifted. Additionally, the Apache National Forest was closed to the public.

On July 3, the fire was 95% contained. The Wallow Fire was declared 100% contained as of 6 p.m., July 8.

Damage
Four commercial buildings were destroyed; 36 outbuildings were destroyed and one damaged; 32 residences were destroyed and 5 damaged. The estimated cost was $109 million.

Widespread smoke plume
The thick smoke in the NASA satellite image was only part of the smoky haze plaguing the continental United States in early June 2011. According to the U.S. Air Quality "Smog Blog", smoke from fires in Arizona and New Mexico extended through Texas and Oklahoma up into the Great Lakes region, affecting air quality for large areas east of the Rocky Mountains.

See also
 2011 Horseshoe 2 Fire

References

External links

 Wallow - InciWeb Incident Information System
 U.S. Air Quality “Smog Blog” at University of Maryland
 Image gallery of the Wallow Fire by the U.S. Forest Service at Flickr.com
 Wallow Fire Information

2011 wildfires in the United States
Wildfires in Arizona
2011 in Arizona
Wildfires in New Mexico
2011 in New Mexico